The Native Americans is a three-part American television documentary miniseries that premiered on TBS on October 10, 1994. The remaining two episodes aired on October 11 and 13, 1994. Directed by John Borden, Phil Lucas and George Burdeau, the six-hour series explores the history of Native American cultures, with each hour of the series devoted to a particular region of the United States.

Music for the series was composed by Robbie Robertson in collaboration with other Native American and Canadian First Nations musicians, including Ulali, Rita Coolidge, Douglas Spotted Eagle and Kashtin, and was released on the album Music for The Native Americans.

References

External links

1990s American television miniseries
1990s American documentary television series
1994 American television series debuts
1994 American television series endings
TBS (American TV channel) original programming
Documentary films about Native Americans
Native American television series
1994 documentary films
1994 films